Dudebox is seven-song EP cassette tape released by Canadian rock band Billy Talent (under their previous name "Pezz") in January 1995. It was a follow-up to their previous release, Demoluca. The decision to spend money for a professional recording by Dave Tedesco at Toronto's Signal to Noise studio enhanced Pezz' sound dramatically. The EP led the way to Pezz' 1999 underground breakthrough full-length album Watoosh!

Track listing

Personnel 

 Benjamin Kowalewicz – lead vocals
 Ian D'Sa – lead guitar, vocals
 Jonathan Gallant – bass guitar, backing vocals
 Aaron Solowoniuk – drums, percussion

Trivia 
 You're It  (remix)  is the only Pezz song that does not feature guitars, only a sampled drum loop and piano are used.

References

External links 
 Official Billy Talent website (former Pezz)
 Official Billy Talent MySpace (former Pezz)
 Official Pezz Myspace

1995 EPs
Billy Talent albums